
Gmina Trzcińsko-Zdrój is an urban-rural gmina (administrative district) in Gryfino County, West Pomeranian Voivodeship, in north-western Poland.

The gmina contains part of the protected area called Cedynia Landscape Park.

Villages
Apart from the town of Trzcińsko-Zdrój, Gmina Trzcińsko-Zdrój contains the villages and settlements of Antoniewice, Babin, Chełm Dolny, Chełm Górny, Cieplikowo, Czyste, Dobropole, Drzesz, Gogolice, Góralice, Górczyn, Klasztorne, Ostrzewka, Piaseczno, Rosnówko, Rosnowo, Smuga, Stołeczna, Strzeszów, Tchórzno and Wesoła.

Neighbouring gminas
Gmina Trzcińsko-Zdrój is bordered by the gminas of Banie, Chojna, Dębno, Mieszkowice and Myślibórz.

References
Polish official population figures 2006

Trzcinsko-Zdroj
Gmina Trzcinsko Zdroj